Međeđa  is a village in the municipality of Kozarska Dubica, Republika Srpska, Bosnia and Herzegovina. Village is mostly inhabited with Serbs.

Notable people 

 Philip Zepter, businessman
 Zoran Lončar, politician
 Savo Lončar, politician

History

World War II 
Mass grave of Ustaše victims from Jasenovac concentration camp, mostly children, was located on the estate of Lončar family in Međeđa. After the decision of SFR Yugoslavian government from 1956, the mass grave was backfilled to make space for Sava river walls.

In the villages: Drakulić, Demirovac and Međeđa, Ustaše enjoined the young Serbian girls to "pull their skirts up, and pricked them between the legs".

From the Prijedor canton village of Međeđa, and many other neighbour villages, Ustaše soldiers required inhabitants to prepare themselves for the departure in 10 minutes. When the 8.000 people came, they expelled them from their villages to the Hrvatska Dubica and put them on some field near the railway station, which had a boundary of barbed wire. Some of them were instantly killed (by fusillade), the other one were sent to concentration camps, and people who were lucky to stay alive were, after long time, sent to Serbia.

References

Populated places in Dubica, Bosnia and Herzegovina